Görogly District   (formerly Tagta District) is a district of Daşoguz Province in Turkmenistan. The administrative center of the district is the city of Görogly.

References

Districts of Turkmenistan
Daşoguz Region